The 2018 ABA League Second Division Final Four is the concluding ABA League Second Division tournament of the 2017–18 ABA League Second Division season. The winner of the final four was promoted to the 2018–19 ABA League First Division.

Venue
After having analyzed the offers, that have been submitted following a tender by 9 February 2018, the ABA League Presidency has decided to award the organization of the Final Four Tournament of the ABA League Second Division to the Borac and their town of Čačak, Serbia.

Qualified teams

Bracket

Source: Adriatic League Second Division

Semifinals

Borac Čačak v Krka

Sixt Primorska v Vršac

Final

References

External links
 Official website (Second Division)
 Official website (First Division)
 ABA League at Eurobasket.com

2017-18
2017–18 in Serbian basketball
2017–18 in Slovenian basketball
2017–18 in Croatian basketball
2017–18 in Bosnia and Herzegovina basketball
2017–18 in Montenegrin basketball
2017–18 in Republic of Macedonia basketball
Adriatic
International basketball competitions hosted by Serbia